Berberis everestiana is a shrub in the family Berberidaceae described as a species in 1961.  It is native to the Himalayas of Tibet and Nepal at elevations of 3800–5000 m.

References

everestiana
Flora of Tibet
Flora of Nepal
Plants described in 1961